Francesco Bontà (born 14 May 1993) is an Italian professional footballer who plays as a midfielder for  club Gubbio.

Career
Born in Giulianova, Bontà started his career in local club Real Giulianova. He made his professional debut in Lega Pro on 9 May 2010 against Rimini.

On 6 September 2017, he moved to Serie D club Monticelli Calcio.

On 23 July 2019, he returned to Campobasso. In August 2020, he extended his contract with the club. He was named team captain.

On 16 July 2022, Bontà signed a two-year contract with Gubbio.

References

External links
 
 

1993 births
Living people
People from Giulianova
Sportspeople from the Province of Teramo
Footballers from Abruzzo
Italian footballers
Association football midfielders
Serie C players
Lega Pro Seconda Divisione players
Serie D players
Giulianova Calcio players
Reggina 1914 players
F.C. Südtirol players
S.S.D. Città di Campobasso players
S.S.D. Jesina Calcio players
A.S. Gubbio 1910 players